June Madge Crown  (born 1938) is a British public health specialist.

She qualified at the University of Cambridge, Middlesex Hospital Medical School and the London School of Hygiene and Tropical Medicine, then worked as a National Health Service Area Medical Officer in Brent and Harrow, and as a District Medical Officer in Bloomsbury.

She has advised the World Health Organization since 1980 and from 1995 to 1998 was President of the Faculty of Public Health.

She was made a Commander of the Order of the British Empire (CBE) in the 1998 Birthday Honours, "For services to Public Health". She is also a Fellow of the Royal College of Physicians (FRCP), and a Fellow of the Faculty of Public Health (FFPH).

References

External links 

 
 Annual Pivotal Event for the Optometric Industry - includes photograph of Crown

1938 births
Place of birth missing (living people)
Living people
Commanders of the Order of the British Empire
Fellows of the Royal College of Physicians
Fellows of the Faculty of Public Health